Nouhak Phoumsavanh or Phoumsavan (9 April 1910– 9 September 2008) was a longtime Pathet Lao revolutionary and communist party official who was the 3rd President of Laos from 1992 to 1998.

Life and career
Nouhak was born in Ban Phalouka in Mukdahan Province, Siam (now Thailand) in 1910, according to official sources,  although his year of birth has also been given as 1914. He married his first wife, Chanthome, in 1933 and they had four children, Phouthone, Phonesavanh, Khankeo and a son. He later remarried in 1944 to Bounema, who was of Vietnamese descent. He was a founding member of the Lao revolutionary movement in 1945, and he became Chairman of the Lao Resistance Committee for the Eastern Region in 1949. In the Lao Resistance Government, he was named Minister of Finance in 1950. He participated in the founding congress of the Lao People's Party (later renamed the Lao People's Revolutionary Party, LPRP) in 1955 and was elected as the second-ranking member of its Central Committee (Deputy Director of the Central Committee).

Nouhak was subsequently the secretary of the Lao People's Party cell in Vientiane, the capital, and was a member of the National Assembly in 1958. He was arrested in 1959 and spent a year in prison in Vientiane before escaping along with Souphanouvong. He was then secretary of the party cell in Khangkhay and had important roles in the party during the 1960s and 1970s, while the Laotian Civil War was ongoing. He was elected to the Politburo at the LPRP's 2nd Congress in February 1972 and was assigned responsibility for economic affairs.

When the Pathet Lao took power in December 1975, Nouhak was appointed as Deputy Prime Minister and Minister of Finance. For years, he was considered "Number 2" in the leadership under Prime Minister Kaysone Phomvihane. He was elected as First Vice-Chairman of the Council of Ministers in April 1982, then as a standing member of the Council of Ministers in charge of economic affairs in November 1986. Nouhak was subsequently elected to the Supreme People's Assembly in 1989 and became President of the Supreme People's Assembly in the same year. Also in 1989, he was chosen as chairman of the commission charged with drafting a new constitution, which was adopted in 1991. With the adoption of this constitution, Kaysone assumed the presidency, which was transformed from a ceremonial to an executive position. After Kaysone's death, Nouhak was elected to succeed him as President of Laos by the Supreme People's Assembly in an extraordinary session on November 25, 1992.

Despite the presidency's executive powers, Prime Minister Khamtai Siphandon held the country's most powerful position as General Secretary of the LPRP. When Khamtai decided to move from Prime Minister to President in 1998, Nouhak, who was by then one of the oldest heads of state in the world, retired, leaving office on 24 February 1998.

Nouhak remained on the Central Committee and Politburo of the LPRP until the party's 6th Congress in 1996. At the 6th Congress in 1996 and the 7th Congress in 2001, he was named as Adviser to the Central Committee's Executive Committee. He reportedly remained in good health throughout his old age, and he was said to have continued making visits to the provinces by helicopter until 2007. He died on 9 September 2008 at the age of 98. The state news agency attributed his death simply to "old age", while noting that he had received medical treatment both in Laos and outside the country. A committee of 26 members, including leading party and state figures (with President Choummaly Sayasone as its chairman), was formed to organize his funeral, and a five-day national mourning period was declared for 10–14 September, during which time all entertainment was prohibited. He was cremated in Vientiane on 14 September.

References

1910 births
2008 deaths
Laotian people of Vietnamese descent
Members of the 1st Central Committee of the Lao People's Party
Members of the 2nd Central Committee of the Lao People's Revolutionary Party
Members of the 3rd Central Committee of the Lao People's Revolutionary Party
Members of the 4th Central Committee of the Lao People's Revolutionary Party
Members of the 5th Central Committee of the Lao People's Revolutionary Party
Members of the 2nd Politburo of the Lao People's Revolutionary Party
Members of the 3rd Politburo of the Lao People's Revolutionary Party
Members of the 4th Politburo of the Lao People's Revolutionary Party
Members of the 5th Politburo of the Lao People's Revolutionary Party
Members of the 2nd Secretariat of the Lao People's Revolutionary Party
Members of the 3rd Secretariat of the Lao People's Revolutionary Party
Lao People's Revolutionary Party politicians
Presidents of Laos
Presidents of the National Assembly of Laos
Finance Ministers of Laos
Deputy Prime Ministers of Laos
Nouhak Phoumsavanh
Nouhak Phoumsavanh